The International 2022 (also known as TI 11 and TI 2022) was the 11th iteration of The International, an annual Dota 2 world championship esports tournament hosted by Valve, the game's developer. The tournament followed the Dota Pro Circuit (DPC), an annual series of tournaments awarding points to teams, with the top 12 earning invitations and a further eight earning them by a series of qualifying playoffs.

The tournament was held in Singapore in October 2022 and was the first International where the main event was hosted at more than one venue, as the playoffs took place at Suntec Singapore followed by the grand finals at Singapore Indoor Stadium. As with every International from 2013 onwards, the prize pool was crowdfunded by the Dota 2 community via its battle pass feature with the total reaching 19 million, the smallest prize pool for an International since 2015. The finals were held between Team Secret and Tundra Esports, with the latter winning.

Background
Dota 2 is a 2013 multiplayer online battle arena (MOBA) video game developed by Valve. In it, two teams of five players compete by selecting characters known as "heroes", each with a variety of innate skills and abilities, and cooperate together to be the first to destroy the base of the other team, which ends the match. The game is played from a top-down perspective, and the player sees a segment of the game's map near their character as well as mini-map that shows their allies, with any enemies revealed outside the fog of war. The game's map has three roughly symmetric "lanes" between each base, with a number of defensive towers protecting each side. Periodically, the team's base spawns a group of weak CPU-controlled creatures, called "creeps", that march down each of the three lanes towards the opponents' base, fighting any enemy hero, creep, or structure they encounter. If a hero character is killed, that character respawns back at their base after a delay period, which gets progressively longer the farther into the match.

As with previous years of the tournament, a corresponding battle pass for Dota 2 was released in 2022, allowing the prize pool to be crowdfunded by players of the game. Those who purchase the pass both support the tournament and gain access to exclusive in-game rewards. A quarter of all revenue made by it up until November 2, 2022, was added directly towards the prize pool. It finalized at $18.9 million, making it the first International to not surpass the previous one's prize pool and the lowest since The International 2015. At the time of event, Dota 2 featured 123 playable characters, called "heroes". Prior to each game in the tournament, a draft is held between the opposing team captains to select which heroes their teams use, going back and forth until each side has banned seven and selected five heroes. Once a hero is picked it can no longer be selected by any other player that match, so teams used the draft to strategically plan ahead and deny the opponents' heroes that may be good counters or would be able to take advantage of weaknesses to their current lineup.

Teams

Group stage

Tier breakers

Main event

Winnings
Note: Prizes are in USD

References

External links
 

2022
2022 in Singaporean sport
2022 multiplayer online battle arena tournaments
October 2022 sports events in Singapore
Esports competitions in Singapore